The Anti-Drug Abuse Act of 1988 is a major law of the War on Drugs passed by the U.S. Congress which did several significant things:
 Created the policy goal of a drug-free America;
 Established the Office of National Drug Control Policy; and
Restored the use of the death penalty by the federal government.

The change from the Act of 1986 to the Act of 1988 concerns the mandatory minimum penalties to drug trafficking conspiracies and attempts that previously were applicable only to substantive completed drug trafficking offenses.  The Act amended 21 U.S.C. 844 to make crack cocaine the only drug with a mandatory minimum penalty for a first offense of simple possession.  The Act made possession of more than five grams of a mixture or substance containing cocaine base punishable by at least five years in prison.  The five year minimum penalty also applies to possession of more than three grams of cocaine base if the defendant has a prior conviction for crack cocaine possession, and to possession of more than one gram of crack if the defendant has two or more prior crack possession convictions.

The Anti-Drug Abuse Act of 1988 also offers several other amendments to the Act of 1986.  First, the organization and coordination of Federal drug control efforts.  Next, the reduction of drug demand through increased treatment and prevention efforts. Also, the reduction of illicit drug trafficking and production abroad. Lastly, sanctions designed to place added pressure on the drug user.  The ADAA projected budget for the total federal drug control budget (if fully funded) was $6.5 billion for the 1989 fiscal year”.  The result of the Anti-Drug Abuse Act of 1988 was not foreseen.  “After spending billions of dollars on law enforcement, doubling the number of arrests and incarcerations, and building prisons at a record pace, the system has failed to decrease the level of drug-related crime. Placing people in jail at increasing rates has had little long-term effect on the levels of crime”.

The Act also re-established the federal death penalty.

The H.R. 5210 legislation was passed by the 100th U.S. Congressional session, and signed into law by president Ronald Reagan on November 18, 1988.

The media campaign mentioned in the act later became the National Youth Anti-Drug Media Campaign.

See also
 Anti-Drug Abuse Act of 1986
 Chemical Diversion and Trafficking Act
 Domestic policy of the Ronald Reagan administration
 Federal drug policy of the United States

References

External links
 Anti-Drug Abuse Act of 1988 (PDF/details) as amended in the Statute Compilations collection

1988 in law
100th United States Congress
United States federal health legislation
United States federal controlled substances legislation
United States statutes that abrogate Supreme Court decisions